Poplar Beach Resort Water Aerodrome Airport was a public airport. It was located adjacent to Poplar Beach, British Columbia, Canada. The airport was listed as abandoned in the 15 March 2007 Canada Flight Supplement.

References

Defunct seaplane bases in British Columbia